Gandhi and Philosophy: On Theological Anti-politics is a book written by philosophers Divya Dwivedi and Shaj Mohan. It was published by Bloomsbury Academic, UK. The book is based on analysis of Mahatma Gandhi's philosophy and has received a positive reception.

Reception 
Bernard Stiegler admired the work, in that it reconsidered the history of nihilism in the eschatological contemporaneity and criticalised Gandhi's thoughts from a new perspective. Robert Bernasconi admired the profound impact of the work, in that it warranted a re-examination of Gandhiji's thought-school and also served as a reflection on the usual Western interpretations of India. Jean-Luc Nancy wrote the foreword and admired the work, as well.

In Open, Siddharth Singh praised the pioneer attempt at a re-interpretation of Gandhi's thought-school using philosophical models, without being overtly dependent on ex-post-facto political developments. Reviewing for The Indian Express, Raj Ayyar admired the work to be highly informed, which sidestepped the usual binary of being either overtly hagiographic or outright vituperative in nature. He further praised the concept of scalology. Another review by Aakash Joshi admired the work as well, in that it distanced itself from political correctness and tackled a lot of usually whitewashed controversies in Gandhi's life using novel philosophical concepts, without necessarily delving into a black-and-white territory.

A review by The Book Review noted the work to be a closely argued and seminal volume, which utilized novel philosophical concepts in dissecting and analyzing Gandhi; the development of scalology and hypophysics were praised, in particular. A review over The Hindu noted the book to be an adventurous but affectionate work, which established Gandhi as a serious philosopher for time and beyond. In a review for The Wire, J. Reghu praised the work as a highly original contribution, which ushered in a remarkable moment for classical philosophy in the subcontinent.

References 

2018 non-fiction books
Books about Mahatma Gandhi
Bloomsbury Publishing books